The Guaynabo River is a river of Guaynabo, Puerto Rico.

See also
General Norzagaray Bridge: crosses the Frailes Creek tributary
List of rivers of Puerto Rico

References

External links
 USGS Hydrologic Unit Map – Caribbean Region (1974)
 Rios de Puerto Rico

Rivers of Puerto Rico